Uvat is the name of several rural localities in Russia:
Uvat, Irkutsk Oblast, a village in Nizhneudinsky District of Irkutsk Oblast
Uvat, Tyumen Oblast, a selo in Uvatsky Rural Okrug of Uvatsky District of Tyumen Oblast